William P. Thompson (January 11, 1844 – October 7, 1864) was a sergeant in the American Civil War and a recipient of the Medal of Honor for action at Battle of the Wilderness during which he was killed on May 6, 1864 with an award being issued to him on December 1, 1864. He was buried at Greenbush Cemetery, Lafayette, Indiana.

References

1844 births
1864 deaths
People of Indiana in the American Civil War
Union Army soldiers
Union military personnel killed in the American Civil War
American Civil War recipients of the Medal of Honor
United States Army Medal of Honor recipients